The 1976 South African Grand Prix (formally the XXII The Citizen Grand Prix of South Africa) was a Formula One motor race held on 6 March 1976 at Kyalami in Transvaal Province, South Africa. It was the second round of the 1976 Formula One season. The race was the 22nd South African Grand Prix and the tenth to be held at Kyalami. The race was held over 78 laps of the 4.104-kilometre circuit for a total race distance of 320 kilometres.

The race was won by Austrian driver Niki Lauda in a Ferrari 312T. The win was Lauda's third win in succession. He finished 1.3 seconds ahead of British driver and Lauda's season long rival James Hunt in a McLaren M23. Hunt's McLaren teammate, West German driver Jochen Mass, finished third.

Hunt took pole position for the second time in two races, with Lauda alongside. Lauda led into the first corner, with Hunt dropping down to fourth behind Mass and Italian driver Vittorio Brambilla in his March 761. Hunt was waved through by Mass, and passed Brambilla to take second after five laps. Lauda led from start to finish to win. Behind Hunt and Mass, South African driver Jody Scheckter was fourth in his Tyrrell 007. A lap down in fifth was British driver John Watson in a Penske PC3 with Mario Andretti sixth in a Parnelli VPJ4B.

Two wins from two races saw Lauda twelve points clear in the championship over Hunt and Tyrrell's Patrick Depailler. In the constructors' championship, Ferrari were nine points clear of Tyrrell and eleven points ahead of McLaren.

Classification

Qualifying

Race

Championship standings after the race

Drivers' Championship standings

Constructors' Championship standings

Note: Only the top five positions are included for both sets of standings.

References

South African Grand Prix
South African Grand Prix
Grand Prix
South African Grand Prix